This is a list of Circulars, distributed documents.

Government publications
Government circular, a written statement of government policy
Chamberlain Circular, a circular issued in 1886 in the United Kingdom encouraging the setting up of work relief projects in times of high unemployment
Circular 10/65, a document issued in 1965 by the Department of Education and Science (DES) requesting Local Education Authorities in England and Wales to begin converting their secondary schools to the Comprehensive System
Circular 230, a document that sets forth the rules to practice before the United States Treasury Department
Court Circular, the official record that lists the engagements carried out by the Monarch of the United Kingdom
Massachusetts Circular Letter, a 1768 statement written by Samuel Adams and passed by the Massachusetts House of Representatives
OMB Circular A-123, a U.S. Office of Management and Budget circular that defines the management responsibilities for internal financial controls in Federal agencies
OMB Circular A-126, a Government circular that introduces standards and policies regarding the management and use of United States Government aircraft
OMB Circular A-130, a circular produced by the United States Federal Government to establish policy for executive branch departments and agencies
OMB Circular A-16, a circular created by the United States Office of Management and Budget to provide guidance for federal agencies that create, maintain or use spatial data directly or indirectly through the establishment of the NSDI and FGDC
OMB Circular A-21, a Government circular that sets forth the rules governing the eligibility and calculation of costs in support of sponsored research, development, training and other works produced in agreement with the United States Federal Government
Specie Circular, an executive order issued by U.S. President Andrew Jackson in 1836
Valuev Circular, a secret 1863 decree of the Minister of Internal Affairs of the Russian Empire

Other publications
Amasya Circular, considered as the first written document putting the Turkish War of Independence in motion
IAU Circular, notices that give information about astronomical phenomena
Minor Planet Circular, circular letter that is generally published on the date of each full moon by the Minor Planet Center
Minor Planet Electronic Circular, publications by the Minor Planet Center that contain positional observations and orbits of unusual minor planets and all comets
Numismatic Circular, an international periodical that has been published since 1892
Pollen Analysis Circular, a botany paper that was published from 1943 to 1952
Pollen and Spore Circular, a botany paper that was published from 1952 to 1954
Post Office circular, a British postal system government circular that gives information of new postage stamps
Uniform Franchise Offering Circular, a legal document that was used in the franchising process in the United States

circulars